The Dalin Refinery is an oil refinery in Xiaogang District, Kaohsiung, Taiwan.

History
The refinery became operationally independent from Kaohsiung Refinery in 1996. In 2009, a gasoline pyrolysis and hydro-desulfurization unit was constructed at the refinery with a capacity of 20,000 barrels per day. In 2010, a diesel hydro-desulfurization unit was constructed with a capacity of 40,000 barrels per day. In 2011, an 18,000 barrels per day gasoline pyrolysis and quality improvement unit was moved from Kaohsiung Refinery to the Dalin plant. In 2013, the residual fluid catalytic cracking unit which was constructed in 2006 began its testing and production. Also in the same year, an alkylation unit with a capacity of 14,000 barrels per day was established at the plant.

Architecture
The refinery spans over an area of 500 hectares.

Accidents and incidents
 10 March 2018, an explosion hit the plant causing part of its production being suspended.

See also
 List of oil refineries
 Mining in Taiwan

References

1996 establishments in Taiwan
Energy infrastructure completed in 1996
Oil refineries in Taiwan